Fabiola Guajardo (born Fabiola Jazmin Guajardo Martínez; January 5, 1987) is a Mexican actress, model, author and musician, known for having competed in Nuestra Belleza Nuevo León 2007 finishing as the first runner up and being finalist on the National pageant of Nuestra Belleza Mexico in 2007.

Biography 
Guajardo was born on January 5, 1987, in Monterrey. In 2011, she made her television debut on Esperanza del Corazón where she had a minor role. She then moved on to play the part of Paola in Por Ella Soy Eva in early 2012. In September 2012, Guajardo played the role of Norma in Corona de lágrimas alongside Victoria Ruffo and Maribel Guardia. She is best known for playing Brigitte Garcia Pabuena in Televisa's successful telenovela De que te quiero, te quiero.

In 2014, Guajardo played a very important role in Televisa's telenovela, Yo no creo en los hombres alongside Adriana Louvier and Gabriel Soto, for which she won the TVyNovelas Award for Best Co-star Actress.  She is played the role of Gabriela Diaz in Pasión y Poder for which she won the TVyNovelas Award for Best Supporting Actress. She had a minor appearance in La Candidata. Guajardo was cast in Enamorándome de Ramón in late 2016.

Filmography

References

External links
 
 
 

1987 births
Living people
Mexican telenovela actresses
Mexican television actresses
Mexican film actresses
Mexican female models
21st-century Mexican actresses
Actresses from Monterrey
Beauty pageant contestants from Monterrey